was a Japanese samurai of the Sengoku period, who was a member of the Shimazu clan of Satsuma Province. He was the fourth son of Shimazu Takahisa. He served in a command capacity during his family's campaign to conquer Kyūshū.

His sons were Shimazu Toyohisa, Shimazu Tadanao, and Shimazu Mitsuhisa. He was nephew of 'Ten'ei-in' (wife of Tokugawa Ienobu) from his mother side and later he married Kamehime and daughter of Shimazu Yoshitaka, Mitsuhime.

He participated in the Battle of Mimigawa (1578), Siege of Minamata Castle (1582), Battle of Okitanawate (1584), and in 1587 he fought against Toyotomi Hideyoshi forces at Battle of Hetsugigawa and Battle of Takajo. In 1587, he suddenly died at Sadowara castle. There is a theory that he was poisoned when he visited Toyotomi Hidenaga's camp.

References

Samurai
1547 births
1587 deaths
Shimazu clan
16th-century Japanese people
People from Kagoshima Prefecture